Allambee Reserve is a locality in Victoria, Australia.

Demographics
The median age of persons in Allambee Reserve was 44 years. There were more males than females, with 52.2% of the population male and 47.8% female. The average household size was 2.8 people per household.

References

Towns in Victoria (Australia)
Shire of South Gippsland